Linda Chang is an American neurologist. She is a professor of diagnostic radiology and nuclear medicine and the vice-chair for faculty development at University of Maryland School of Medicine.

Education 
Chang completed a bachelor of science in biochemistry through the honors program at University of Maryland, College Park in 1981. Chang earned a master of science in physiology and biophysics from Georgetown University in 1982.  Chang completed a medical doctorate at Georgetown University School of Medicine in 1986. Chang completed a residency in neurology at Ronald Reagan UCLA Medical Center in 1990. She completed a fellowship at UCLA in 1991 in neuromuscular diseases and electrophysiology with mentor Thomas L. Anderson. In 1992, she completed a research fellowship in neuroimaging studies in dementia with mentor Bruce Miller at UCLA.

Career 
From 1992 to 1999, Chang was an assistant professor of neurology at UCLA School of Medicine. She was an associate professor from 1999 to 2000. Chang was a scientist and the chair of the medical department at Brookhaven National Laboratory from 2000 to 2004. She worked as a professor of medicine at the John A. Burns School of Medicine at University of Hawaii at Manoa from 2004 to 2017. Starting in 2017, she is an adjunct clinical professor at the University of Hawaii and an adjunct professor in the department of neurology at Johns Hopkins School of Medicine. She is a professor of neurology, diagnostic radiology, and nuclear medicine and the vice-chair for faculty development at University of Maryland School of Medicine.

Research 
Chang's research focuses on the application of advanced neuroimaging techniques and genetics in the study of various neurological disorders, HIV, substance use disorders and brain development and aging.

Awards and honors 
Chang was elected a fellow of the American Academy of Neurology in 2003. In 2005, she was elected a member of the American College of Neuropsychopharmacology. Chang was elected as a fellow member of the International Society of Magnetic Resonance in Medicine in 2008. She became a fellow member of the American Neurological Association in 2012.  In 2021, she received the National Institute on Drug Abuse Avant Garde Award for HIV/AIDS and Substance Use Disorder Research.

References

External links
 

Living people
Year of birth missing (living people)
American neurologists
Women neurologists
University of Maryland, College Park alumni
Georgetown University School of Medicine alumni
David Geffen School of Medicine at UCLA faculty
Brookhaven National Laboratory staff
University of Hawaiʻi at Mānoa faculty
20th-century American women scientists
21st-century American women scientists
20th-century American scientists
21st-century American scientists
20th-century American physicians
21st-century American physicians
20th-century American women physicians
21st-century American women physicians
University of Maryland School of Medicine faculty
American women academics
Fellows of the American Academy of Neurology
American medical academics